Spalacomimus is a genus of African bush crickets in the subfamily Hetrodinae and tribe Eugastrini.

Species
 Spalacomimus aberrans (Schulthess, 1898) 
 Spalacomimus inermis (Uvarov, 1934) 
 Spalacomimus liberiana (La Baume, 1911) 
 Spalacomimus magnus (La Baume, 1911) 
 Spalacomimus stettinensis (Weidner, 1941) 
 Spalacomimus talpa (Gerstaecker, 1869) 
 Spalacomimus verruciferus (Karsch, 1887)

References 

Tettigoniidae genera